Satpal Tanwar (born 29 October 1984) is an Indian social activist, and the founder and national president of Bhim Sena.

Early life and education 
Satpal Tanwar was born in the Khandsa village, part of the Gurugram district in Haryana to a family of army officers. He earned his B.A. in Political Science from University of Delhi, LLB from Faculty of Law, University of Delhi, MA in Public Administration from Jamia Millia Islamia and MA in Political Science from Indira Gandhi National Open University.

Career
Tanwar is the founder and national president of Bhim Sena (All India Ambedkar Army). Bhim Sena was founded by Tanwar in 2010 and he was the key person in organising 2017 protests at Jantar Mantar regarding inaction in the Saharanpur violence case. He was support to Bhim Army in 2017.
Tanwar is a lawyer, legal consultant, legal document writer and auditor, shareholder and real estate businessman.

He also writes poems, articles, blogs and also runs channel on YouTube. He writes for the Navbharat Times and many other news portals, and he owns a printing agency. He is also president of the social front Nigahein.

He actively took part in the April 2018 caste protests and organised members of Bhim Sena at Kamla Nehru Park in Delhi.

In 2020, he organised a protest against the Hathras gangrape case at Gurgaon, allying with other Dalit organizations.

Controversies 
Tanwar filed a case under the SC/ST Act against Haryanvi dancer Sapna Chaudhary for allegedly degrading the Dalit community in one of the folk ragni songs. She attempted suicide after the case in 2016, blaming Tanwar for running online propaganda against her. Later on the case against her was cancelled and he was booked for abetment.

He was then attacked by a group of unknown men (alleged supporters of Sapna) late at night. Later an Indian Army soldier was caught threatening him over the phone for drawing back the case.

Tanwar landed in controversy again in 2022 for his misogynistic and derogatory remarks against Nupur Sharma, for her alleged blasphemous comments made during a television debate. He went on to offer 1 crore rupees to whoever severs her tongue and bring it to him. He claimed that she deserves to be hanged, which eventually got his Twitter account suspended. He was arrested, but later released on bail.

See also
Ambedkarism

References

Living people
1984 births
People from Gurgaon
Jamia Millia Islamia alumni
Faculty of Law, University of Delhi alumni
Dalit activists
Dalit writers
Dalit politicians
Dalit leaders